A cold case is a crime, or a suspected crime, that has not yet been fully resolved and is not the subject of a current criminal investigation, but for which new information could emerge from new witness testimony, re-examined archives, new or retained material evidence, or fresh activities of a suspect. New technological methods developed after the crime was committed can be used on the surviving evidence to analyse causes, often with conclusive results.

Characteristics

Violent or major crime

Typically, cold cases are violent and other major felony crimes, such as murder and rape, which—unlike unsolved minor crimes—are generally not subject to a statute of limitations.

Sometimes disappearances can also be considered cold cases if the victim has not been seen or heard from for some time, such as the case of Natalee Holloway or the Beaumont children.

About 35% of those cases are not cold cases at all. Some cases become instantly cold when a seeming closed (solved) case is re-opened due to the discovery of new evidence pointing away from the original suspect(s). Other cases are cold when the crime is discovered well after the fact—for example, by the discovery of human remains. Some cases become classified cold cases when a case that had been originally ruled an accident or suicide is re-designated as murder when new evidence emerges.

The John Christie murders is a notable case when Timothy Evans was wrongly executed for the alleged murders of his wife and child. Many other bodies were later found in the house where they lived with Christie, and he was then executed for the crimes. The case helped a campaign against capital punishment in Britain.

Identifying a suspect
A case is considered unsolved until a suspect has been identified, charged, and tried for the crime.  A case that goes to trial and does not result in a conviction can also be kept on the books pending new evidence.

In some cases, a suspect, often called a "person of interest" or "subject" is identified early on but no evidence definitively linking the subject to the crime is found at that time and more often than not the subject is not forthcoming with a confession. This often happens in cases where the subject has an alibi, alibi witnesses, or lack of forensic evidence. Eventually, the alibi is disproved, the witnesses recanted their statements or advances in forensics helped bring the subjects to justice.

Sometimes a case is not solved but forensic evidence helps to determine that the crimes are serial crimes. The BTK case and Original Night Stalker (the latter pending trial as of April 24, 2018) cases are such examples. The Texas Rangers have established a website in the hopes that it shall elicit new information and investigative leads.

Tunnel vision
Sometimes, a viable suspect has been overlooked or simply ignored due to then-flimsy circumstantial evidence, the presence of a likelier suspect (who is later proven to be innocent), or a tendency of investigators to zero in on someone else to the exclusion of other possibilities (which goes back to the likelier suspect angle)—known as "tunnel vision".

Improvements in forensics
With the advent of and improvements to DNA testing and other forensics technology, many cold cases are being re-opened and prosecuted. Police departments are opening cold case units whose job is to re-examine cold case files. DNA evidence helps in such cases but as in the case of fingerprints, it is of no value unless there is evidence on file to compare it to.

Famous criminal examples

The identity of Jack the Ripper is a notorious example of an outstanding cold case, with numerous suggestions as to the identity of the serial killer. Similarly, the Zodiac Killer has been studied extensively for almost 50 years, with numerous suspects discussed and debated. The perpetrators of the Wall Street bombing of 1920 have never been positively identified, though the Galleanists, a group of Italian anarchists, are widely believed to have planned the explosion. The burning of the Reichstag building in 1933 remains controversial and although Marinus van der Lubbe was tried, convicted and executed for arson, it is possible that the Reichstag fire was perpetrated by the Nazis to enhance their power and destroy democracy in Germany.

Examples of criminal cold cases that ended in conviction

1940s

1950s

1960s

1970s

1980s

1990s

2000s

Examples without conviction, but considered solved or likely solved

1910s

1960s

1970s

1980s

1990s

2000s

Examples of unsolved criminal cold cases

In popular culture

Film 
 In the movie Max Payne, Detective Max Payne works in Cold Case, NYPD

Literature 

The phrase "Cold Case" is found in a number of story and book titles. Examples include:
 L.L. Bartlett (2010). "Cold Case". A Jeff Resnick Mystery. . Polaris Press. This short story inspired the fourth Jeff Resnick book, Bound by Suggestion.
  True crime.
  A children's book/mystery.
  An urban novel.
  An education and reference book.

Music 
 Cold Case Files (2008) and Cold Case Files Vol. 2 (2012) are compilation albums by the rap group Onyx
 "Cold Case Love" is a song on Rihanna's Rated R album, released November 23, 2009 on the Def Jam label
 "Stella: The Cold Case" is an EP by

Television 
 The Canadian television series Cold Squad (1998–2005), the British television series Waking the Dead (2000–2011) and the US television series Cold Case (2003–2010) all follow groups of fictional homicide detectives who investigate cold cases. They are set in Vancouver, London and Philadelphia, respectively.
 Cold Case Files (1999–2006) is a documentary-style television series recounting actual solved cold cases.
 New Tricks is a BBC series revolving around retired CID officers acting as consultants to serving officers and investigating unsolved cold cases.
 Unforgotten is a ITV,  DCI Cassie Stuart (Nicola Walker) and DI Sunny Khan (Sanjeev Bhaskar), as they solve cold cases of disappearance and murder.

 Video game 
 Chase: Cold Case Investigations - Distant Memories is a video game about two detectives of the Tokyo Metropolitan Police Department's cold case unit, Shounosuke Nanase and Koto Amekura.

 See also 
 Clearance rate
 FBI Victims Identification Project
 Forensic engineering
 Forensic photography
 Forensic science
 Genealogical DNA test

 References 

 External links 

 Cold Case Investigation Units TELEMASP Bulletin, Texas Law Enforcement Management and Administrative Statistics Program
  – explains sentencing in the UK, for cases that took place long ago.''
 Cold Case Website

 
Criminal investigation